The Seaward Eagle, sometimes called the Seaward Eagle 32, is an American sailboat that was designed by Nick Hake as a cruiser and first built in 1996.

Production
The design was built by Hake Yachts in the United States, starting in 1996, but it is now out of production.

Design
The Seaward Eagle is a recreational keelboat, built predominantly of fiberglass. It has a fractional sloop rig, a plumb stem, a vertical transom, an internally mounted spade-type rudder controlled by a wheel and a fixed wing keel or optional lifting keel, powered by an electric winch.

The boat is fitted with an inboard engine for docking and maneuvering.

The design has sleeping accommodation for six people, with a double "V"-berth in the bow cabin, an "U"-shaped settee around a drop-down table in the main cabin and an aft cabin with a double berth on the port side. The galley is located on the starboard side just forward of the companionway ladder. The galley is "U"-shaped and is equipped with a two-burner stove, icebox and a double sink. The head is located just aft of the bow cabin on the port side.

Operational history
Noted naval architect Robert Perry reviewed the design in 2002, for Sailing Magazine, writing, "I thought this was a handsome boat with a perky, near-plumb stem, nice accenting rubrail and well-sculpted deck structures. What I don't like about his design is the way the sheer spring has been exaggerated aft. This is a great example of why you need to think of these lines in three dimensions. The sailplan shows this strong sheerline, and it looks just fine. But in the water, it appears to my eye that there is some conflict with the sheer's low point and the distribution of beam. The kick in the sheer aft is just too exaggerated for my eye. Still, it's good to see a designer with the chutzpa to put a healthy spring in the sheer. It certainly gives this boat a distinct personality, and nit-picking aside I like this boat."

A 2004 review in Sail magazine noted, "the accommodations, designed around the keel trunk in the saloon, are comfortable and well suited to coastal cruising."

See also
List of sailing boat types

References

Keelboats
1990s sailboat type designs
Sailing yachts 
Sailboat type designs by Nick Hake
Sailboat types built by Hake Yachts